The UT Martin Skyhawks men's basketball statistical leaders are individual statistical leaders of the UT Martin Skyhawks men's basketball program in various categories, including points, assists, blocks, rebounds, and steals. Within those areas, the lists identify single-game, single-season, and career leaders. The Skyhawks represent the University of Tennessee at Martin in the NCAA Division I Ohio Valley Conference.

UT Martin began competing in intercollegiate basketball in 1951, initially as a member of the Volunteer State Athletic Conference and competing in the NAIA. The Skyhawks, nicknamed "Pacers" before 1995–96, joined the NCAA in 1971 as a member of the Gulf South Conference, then competing in the NCAA College Division. When the NCAA split the College Division in 1973, creating the limited-scholarship Division II and the non-scholarship Division III, the Gulf South, including UT Martin, moved to Division II. The Pacers moved to Division I in 1991. This history is significant because the official recording of statistics began at different times in different organizations, as well as different NCAA divisions.

The NAIA record books do not indicate when the organization began officially recording statistics on a national basis, but its current records (as of 2019–20) for single-game and single-season assists were both set in 1972–73, and the career record for blocks dates to 1975. The NCAA had recorded individual assists for two seasons in the early 1950s, but did not resume doing so until 1983–84, and even then only in Division I. The NCAA did not begin officially recording assists in its two lower divisions until 1988–89. As for blocks and steals, they were first recorded in D-I in that same 1988–89 season; by the time those statistics were recorded in D-II and D-III (1992–93), UT Martin had joined D-I. The UT Martin record books include players in all named statistics, regardless of whether they were officially recorded by any of the governing bodies in which the school was a member.

These lists are updated through the end of the 2020–21 season.

Scoring

Rebounds

Assists

Steals

Blocks

References

Lists of college basketball statistical leaders by team
Statistical